Revenge of the Flame is a 1956 Turkish drama film directed by Osman F. Seden. The stars of the film are Ayhan Işık, Mualla Kaynak, Kenan Pars, Deniz Tanyeli, Turgut Özatay, Nubar Terziyan, and Temel Karamahmut.

References

External links
 
 

1956 films
Turkish drama films
1956 drama films
Turkish black-and-white films